Miriam Peretz (born 10 April 1954) is an Israeli educator and public speaker. After the deaths of two of her sons during their service in the Israel Defense Forces, Peretz became a lecturer on Zionism and living with loss. She was the recipient of the Israel Prize in 2018, for lifetime achievement.

In May 2021, Peretz announced that she would run for President of Israel in the 2021 election as an Independent candidate. She ended up losing the election to Isaac Herzog, 26–87.

Early life and education 
Peretz was born to Moroccan Jewish parents Yaakov Ohayon and Ito Vaknin in Casablanca, Morocco. In 1963, the family left Morocco and made aliyah to Israel. Upon arriving in Israel, they settled in Beersheba. Peretz went on to earn a bachelor's degree in literature and history from Ben-Gurion University of the Negev, and later married Eliezer Peretz in the mid-1970s. After her marriage, she moved to Ofira, an Israeli settlement on the Sinai Peninsula, where her husband worked as an inspector for the Ministry of Health and she began working as a teacher. While living in Ofira, the family had two sons: Uriel and Eliraz.

Following the signing of the Egypt–Israel peace treaty, the Sinai Peninsula was returned to Egypt in 1982, and Israeli settlers were forced to relocate. Peretz and her family first relocated to Giv'on HaHadasha, and later to Giv'at Ze'ev, both Israeli settlements in the West Bank. After the relocation, Peretz had four more children: Hadas, Avichai, Elisaf, and Bat-El. In Giv'at Ze'ev, Peretz became the principal of the settlement's first Israeli school.

Public speaking 
 
In 1998, Peretz's eldest son Uriel Peretz was killed during an ambush in South Lebanon. Shortly after his death, Peretz's husband Eliezer developed a serious illness and later died as well. In 2010, Peretz's second son Eliraz Peretz was killed in the March 2010 Israel–Gaza clashes.

Following the deaths of her two eldest sons and her husband, Peretz became a public speaker on issues surrounding Zionism and coping with loss, lecturing the youth and Israel Defense Forces soldiers. In 2011, she released the book Shirat Miriam, which chronicles the story of her life. In 2014, Peretz was selected to light a torch at the celebration of Israel's 66th Independence Day. In 2016, she received an honorary doctorate from Bar-Ilan University. In 2018, Peretz received the Israel Prize for lifetime achievement, considered to be the highest cultural honor awarded by Israel.

Politics
In May 2021, Peretz announced that she would run for president of Israel in the 2021 election. Presidential candidates must secure the support of at least 10 members of the Knesset in order to run in the election, which Peretz did. She ended up losing the election to Isaac Herzog, 26–87.

Personal life
Peretz continues to reside in Giv'at Ze'ev. She currently serves as the head of a teacher education centre within the Society and Youth Dicrectorate at the Israeli Ministry of Education.

References 

1954 births
20th-century Israeli educators
21st-century Israeli educators
Ben-Gurion University of the Negev alumni
Heads of schools in Israel
Candidates for President of Israel
Israeli Jews
Israeli memoirists
Israeli people of Moroccan-Jewish descent
Israel Prize for lifetime achievement & special contribution to society recipients
Israel Prize women recipients
Israeli schoolteachers
Israeli settlers
Living people
Moroccan emigrants to Israel
Educators from Beersheba
People from Casablanca